Idar is one of the 182 Legislative Assembly constituencies of Gujarat state in India. It is part of Sabarkantha district, numbered as 28-Idar and is reserved for candidates belonging to the Scheduled Castes.

List of segments

This assembly seat represents the following segments,

 Vadali Taluka
 Idar Taluka

Members of Legislative Assembly

Election results

2022

2017

2012

See also
 List of constituencies of the Gujarat Legislative Assembly
 Sabarkantha district

References

External links
 

Assembly constituencies of Gujarat
Sabarkantha district